Gaman is a Hindi film released in 1978, starring Farooq Sheikh and Smita Patil in the lead roles and introducing Nana Patekar in a supporting role. It is the directorial debut of Muzaffar Ali, who went on to make Umrao Jaan (1981). The film deals with the issue of the futility of urban migration, using the story of a migrant from Uttar Pradesh to Mumbai, who tries to find a foothold in his new life as a taxi driver.

The film's music was by Jaidev, who won the National Film Award for Best Music Direction in 1979 for his work, and for the Song "Aap ki Yaad Aati Rahi", Chhaya Ganguly won a National Film Award for Best Female Playback Singer. Shahryar wrote songs for the film, most notably "Seene Mein Jalan, Aankhon Mein Toofaan", sung by Suresh Wadkar, which highlighted the alienation and broken dreams of the migrant community. Ghazal singer Hariharan made his playback singing debut with the film.

Plot
In order to improve their lifestyle, Ghulam Hasan (Farooq Shaikh), who hails from Lakhimpur Kheri, a town in Uttar Pradesh, decides to relocate to Bombay, on the insistence of his close friend Lalulal Tiwari (Jalal Agha). He leaves behind his ailing mother and wife (Smita Patil). Lalulal helps him get a job cleaning taxis. Ghulam subsequently learns how to drive, and is hired to drive a taxi. In spite of his best efforts, he is unable to save enough money to visit Lucknow and his family.

Lalulal has problems of his own, in spite of being settled in Bombay for several years.  Having a sweetheart, Yashodra (Gita Siddharth), he is unable to even rent a decent apartment, and lives in a shanty tenement, which is slated to be demolished by the Bombay Municipal Corporation.

Ultimately, Lalulal and Yashodara are murdered by the latter's family, as the family wants Yashodara to support them instead of marrying Lalulal. Ghulam decides to return to Lucknow, but procrastination prevents him from doing so. Closing shots show him driving his taxi in the city of dreams.

Cast
Farooq Shaikh as Ghulam Hasan
Smita Patil as Khairun
Gita Siddharth as Yashodhara
Sulabha Deshpande as Vasu's mom
Jalal Agha as Lallulal Tewari
Protima Bedi as Passenger doing make up
Nana Patekar as Vasu
Satish Shah as Passenger
Arvind Deshpande as Shankar
Amir Bano as Amma
Arun Bhutanatha
Dinshaw Daji as Parsi passenger
Hameed
Arun Joglekar as Ganpat
Hridaya Lani
Hira Devi Mishra as Lalluram's mother
Nitin Sethi as Thakur Amar singh
Mahabali Singh

Soundtrack

Awards and nominations

|-
| 1979
| Chhaya Ganguli (for Aap ki Yaad Aati Rahi)
| National Film Award for Best Female Playback Singer
| 
|-
| 1979
| Jaidev 
| National Film Award for Best Music Direction
| 
|}

References

External links

1970s Hindi-language films
1970s Urdu-language films
Urdu-language Indian films
1978 films
Films directed by Muzaffar Ali
Films set in Lucknow
Films set in Mumbai
Films shot in Mumbai
Works about human migration
Films scored by Jaidev
1978 directorial debut films